The Hamilton Motors Company was founded in 1917 by Guy Hamilton, after his Grand Haven, Michigan Alter Motor Car Company went bankrupt. The company produced only one car, the Model A-14, which was a four-cylinder, 28 hp touring car with a  wheelbase. He promised to make a six-cylinder car, but never did.

In 1918, the H. A. Oswald Engineering Company tried to resurrect the Hamilton as the Oswald, but it failed. However, Hamilton's Alter truck was produced until 1921.

References 

 

Motor vehicle manufacturers based in Michigan
Defunct motor vehicle manufacturers of the United States
Vehicle manufacturing companies established in 1917
1917 establishments in Michigan